In enzymology, an UDP-glucosamine 4-epimerase is an enzyme that catalyzes the chemical reaction

UDP-glucosamine  UDP-galactosamine

Hence, this enzyme has one substrate, UDP-glucosamine, and one product, UDP-galactosamine.

This enzyme belongs to the family of isomerases, specifically those racemases and epimerases acting on carbohydrates and derivatives.  The systematic name of this enzyme class is UDP-glucosamine 4-epimerase.

References

 
 

EC 5.1.3
Enzymes of unknown structure